Dejang, also known as Dejing or Dejank, may refer to:
 Dejang-e Bala
 Dejang-e Pain